Zhang Lixiong (Chinese: 张力雄, born 21 November 1913) is a Chinese military officer and politician.

Biography
Zhang joined the CCP in 1931 and became a founding major general of PLA in 1961. He served as a deputy in the 4th National People's Congress from 1975 to 1978.

References

1913 births
Living people
Chinese centenarians
Men centenarians